Banská Štiavnica District is a district in the Banská Bystrica Region of central Slovakia. Until 1920, most of the present-day district belonged to the county of Kingdom of Hungary of Hont, apart from Močiar and Podhorie in the north (Tekov) and Kozelník in the east (Zvolen county).

Municipalities

References 

 
Districts of Slovakia